Arthur Douglas Cordner (30 August 1887 in Ireland – 3 July 1946 in Dublin) was an Irish cricketer. A right-handed batsman and wicket-keeper, he played three times for the Ireland cricket team, making his debut against Scotland in July 1926. One of his matches for Ireland had first-class status.

References

1887 births
1946 deaths
Irish cricketers
Wicket-keepers